Wyoming v. Colorado, 259 U.S. 419 (1922) is a set of court cases, all dealing with water distribution from the Laramie River. A petition for rehearing was granted, which revised the original decision. A motion to dismiss was later denied.

Background
When a dispute arises between two states, the case is filed for original jurisdiction with the United States Supreme Court. This is one of the very limited circumstances where the court acts with original jurisdiction, e.g. a trial court. In all other cases the Court acts as the highest level appellate court in the United States.

The state of Wyoming brought an action against the state of Colorado to prevent the diversion of a stream system. Wyoming claimed the doctrine of prior appropriation granted them superior rights to the stream water, as they claimed the water first, and that Colorado's proposed diversion would leave them with an insufficient supply of water.

Opinion of the Court
The Court upheld Wyoming's prior appropriation water rights, preventing Colorado's proposed diversion of the stream system as originally planned. However, the Court allowed Colorado to divert a lesser amount of water, as long as it did not interfere with Wyoming's prior water usage.

See also 
 Arizona v. California

References

External links
 
 

United States water case law
United States Supreme Court cases
United States Supreme Court cases of the Taft Court
1922 in United States case law
United States Supreme Court original jurisdiction cases
1922 in Wyoming
1922 in Colorado
1922 in the environment
Legal history of Wyoming
Legal history of Colorado